Douglas John Rolfe (26 February 1953 – 1 June 2020) was an Australian cricketer. He played five first-class cricket matches for Victoria and South Australia between 1976 and 1981.

See also
 List of Victoria first-class cricketers

References

External links
 

1953 births
2020 deaths
Australian cricketers
South Australia cricketers
Victoria cricketers
Cricketers from Melbourne